Brzeg (Latin: Alta Ripa, German: Brieg, Silesian German: Brigg) is a town in southwestern Poland with 34,778 inhabitants (December 2021) and the capital of Brzeg County. It is situated in Silesia in the Opole Voivodeship on the left bank of the Oder river.

The town of Brzeg was first mentioned as a trading and fishing settlement in the year 1234. In 1248, Silesian Duke Henry III the White granted the settlement Magdeburg town rights and by the late 13th century the city became fortified. Sometimes referred to as “the garden town”, the town's size greatly expanded after the construction of dwelling houses which were located on the city outskirts. From the early 14th to late 17th centuries, the town was ruled by the Piast dynasty as fiefs of the Bohemian Crown within the Holy Roman Empire. Later, as the result of the Silesian Wars, the town became Prussian. After the border shifts of 1945, the town's German populace was expelled and the town became part of Poland.

Etymology
In older documents, Brzeg was referred to as Civitas Altae Ripae, meaning 'city on the high banks' of the Oder River; its name is derived from Polish brzeg 'shore'. 
 (1841–1895), in his book of the etymology of Silesian localities, states that in a Latin document from 1234 the settlement's name was Visoke breg (literally 'high bank').

A native or resident of Brzeg is known as a brzeżan, brzeżanin (male), brzeżanka (female), brzeżanie and brzeżaninie (plural).

History

Prehistory

The locality in and around present-day Brzeg has been settled by people since the Mesolithic era, with the earliest signs of settlement between 8000 and 4200 BC, as concluded from archaeological findings in Myślibórz, Kościerzyce, Lubsza and Lipki. The early human populous left behind traces of lithic flakes, flint flakes and other flint related tools. The earliest signs of agriculture come around during the Neolithic Era (4200–1700 BC). The Neolithic culture developed agriculture and domesticated farm animals; this lifestyle led Nomadic cultures to settle in the locality. The era saw the development of weaving, pottery and mining in the Brzeg Plain, with archaeological finds in Brzeg, Buszyce, Prędocin, Lewin Brzeski, Małujowice, Lipki, Myśliborze, Mąkoszyce and Obórki.

The time period of 1300–700 BC bears the existence of the Lusatian culture of the late Bronze Age and the early Iron Age. The culture settled in the region and in large continued to develop agriculture and the domestication of farm animals. The natural economy of the culture was based on weaving, pottery and metal works. The Lusatian culture's populous that inhabited the Brzeg Lands was identified by archaeological excavations, revealing 17 individual localities, including 3 hamlets and 8 burial sites, namely a fortified wooden settlement in Rybna and an open-pit crematory in Pisarzowice (with 30 discovered burial sites).

To follow the Lusatian culture, which witnessed its declension around 500 BC, were the Celts, around 400–300 BC in Silesia, as identified with archaeological findings in Lubsza and Pawłów (located in the eastern vicinity of Brzeg). Around 100 BC, the peoples of Silesia (Celtic and Germanic tribes) began trading with the Roman Empire, as evidenced through the findings of Roman currency in the locality. In the 7th century Slavic peoples started settling in the region. At the same time Iron tools and blacksmith-based hamlets found in Kantorowice and Pępice are evidenced for the first time in this region.

Silesian period and foundation
The period of AD 500–1000 saw the establishment of the early feudal system in Silesia. The era was characteristic of the establishment of gord settlements, towns and the continued development of trade and crafts. It is believed the permanent populous around modern-day Brzeg was set up by Silesian tribes. The importance of the Ryczyn gords is demonstrated by Henry V of the Holy Roman Empire's army halting their advancement before the gords in 1109.

Between the ninth and early-tenth century, the Brzeg Lands, together with all of Silesia, were part of Great Moravia until its demise in AD 906, after which, until 990 the region was under the rule of the Premyslids. Around the year 990, Silesia was annexed into Mieszko I's Poland. During the Fragmentation of Poland (1138 – c. 1314), the area of the Brzeg Lands, along with the rest of Silesia, came under the control of King of Poland, Bolesław III Wrymouth's oldest son, Władysław II the Exile.

The most favourable area for the settlement of Brzeg is located between the Castle Square (Plac Zamkowy), with elevated ground extending south-east towards the Square of the American Polonia (Plac Polonii Amerykańskiej). Before the town's foundation, three separate settlements existed in its modern-day territory, with "Wysoki Brzeg" (Alta ripa) bearing the main administrative role in the region. Between the late-twelfth and early-thirteen century, the Dukes of Wrocław set up a curia, led by a claviger. In 1235, Henry the Bearded occupied the area around Oława, by which Walloons had to turn over a tribute of 1 scale of grain and of oat to the settlement of Brzeg, suggesting the existence of a granary and other outbuildings in the curia's established headquarters.

Some two hundred m south-west from the curia was the former location, on what was later to be called Mary's Hill (Góra Marii), of the Romanesque St. Mary's Church (Kościół Najświętszej Marii Panny). During the Reformation, the church was deconstructed, and its brickwork used for the construction of the town's fortifications. A sixteenth-century chronicle states it was "the first church", however, no more is known about the holy site. Historians believe the founder of the church may have been Bolesław I the Tall or Henry the Bearded. Around the peripheries of the settlement was the location of several hospital buildings. Towards the route to Wrocław in the town's west was the location of the Hospital of the Holy Ghost (Świętego Ducha), used both to cure the town's dwellers and as an inn for travellers along the Wrocław-Opole route the town of Brzeg was located in the middle of, with an average walking distance between each town taking one day. The area around the Holy Ghost Hospital, present-day Moniuszko Square (Plac Moniuszki), was the location of a major market, positioned by the cross roads of the Wrocław–Nysa route, east of the Wrocławska Gate. By the end of the thirteenth century, the Duke of Brzeg possessed 10 shambles. The market is believed to be characteristic of other Silesian towns, commonly selling agricultural produce, namely bread, meat and shoes. Prior to the locality receiving its town charter in 1248 or 1250, the settlement had characteristics of a town and not of an ordinary fishing village, being referred to as "civitas" in an early Latin document, as exemplified by the existence of the curia, church and a major market, allowing the settlement to develop through the exchange of produce and barter.

Prior to Brzeg receiving its town charter, the Duke of Wrocław, Henry III the White, received the settlement of Małkowice, (present-day Kępa Młyńska), in exchange of his feudal rights over Zębice (south-west from Oława). The fishermen living in Małkowice (present-day ul. Rybacka), in accordance to ancient Polish law were charged with the task of protecting the Ducal Castle along the riverside. By the turn of the thirteenth century, the defenceless populous living in the pastures of the Brzeg Plain began to relocate into the fortified Visoke breg, building up a new osiedle around the present-day streets of: Łokietka, Piastowska and Trzech Kotwic (extending south-east). The osiedle was documented as Stary Brzeg (Antiqua Brega; Alt Brieg), to be renamed Wieś Brzeska: Brygischedorf (c. 1329) and villa Bregensis in  1339. To the west of the fortified centre of Brzeg, the settlement of Rataje (a separate village until 1975) as the former village's etymology suggests, centered around the upkeep of the ducal pastures.

Middle Ages and Early Modern period

The town received German town law in 1250 from the Wrocław Duke Henry III the White. The foundation was carried out by the three lokators, Gerkinus of Goldberg, Ortlif and Heinrich of Reichenbach. From the emblem of Heinrich of Reichenbach the town also got its coat of arms. While in power, Henry III, granted the town (by a singular payment) the forest around the locality of Lubsza. His successor, Henryk IV the Righteous regulated the town's church affairs, as well as renouncing his patronage over St. Mary's Church (Kościół Św. Marii Panny), located west of the town's western boundary. The church was granted to the Order of Saint John, subsequently founding the Church of St. Nicholas in 1292. The town was fortified in 1297.

From 1311 to 1675 Brzeg was the capital of a Lower Silesian duchy (Duchy of Brzeg) ruled by the Piast dynasty, a branch of the dukes of Lower Silesia, one of whom built a castle in 1341. The Duchy became part of the Kingdom of Bohemia in 1329. The town was burned by the Hussites in 1428 and soon afterwards rebuilt.

In 1595 Brieg was again fortified by Joachim Frederick of Brieg and Liegnitz. In the Thirty Years' War it suffered greatly; in the War of the Austrian Succession it was heavily bombarded by the Prussian forces; and in 1807 it was captured by Napoleon's army. When Bohemia fell to the Habsburg monarchy of Austria in 1526, the town fell under the overlordship of the Habsburgs in their roles of Kings of Bohemia, although it was still ruled locally by the Silesian Piasts. Upon the extinction of the last duke George William of Legnica in 1675, Brieg came under the direct rule of the Habsburgs.

Late modern and contemporary

In 1537 the duke Frederick II of Legnica concluded a treaty with Elector Joachim II of Brandenburg, whereby the Hohenzollerns of Brandenburg would inherit the duchy upon the extinction of the Silesian Piasts. On the death of George William the last duke in 1675, however, Austria refused to acknowledge the validity of the treaty and annexed the duchies and Frederick the Great of the Kingdom of Prussia used this treaty to justify his claim at the invasion of Silesia during the War of the Austrian Succession in 1740. Brieg and most of Silesia were annexed by Prussia in 1741 during the First Silesian War. In 1807 the town's fortifications were pulled down by Napoleon's army. The Prussian Province of Silesia, and thus Brieg, consequently became part of the German Empire when it was proclaimed in 1871 on the unification of Germany. According to the Prussian census of 1905, the city of Brieg had a population of 27,486, of which 93% spoke German, 6% spoke Polish, and 1% were bilingual.

During World War II, 60% of Brieg was destroyed and many of the town's inhabitants died during the severe winter of 1944–5 as they fled from the advancing Red Army. The war had brought the most severe destruction to the town in its entire history. Some of the town's population was evacuated by the German Army who moved its population further west inside Germany for safety and declared Brieg "Festung Brieg" (Fortification Brieg). After the fall of the town to the Soviets the remaining German population were later subject to harassment and expulsion (see Expulsion of Germans after World War II). After the war, the Potsdam Conference placed Silesia, and thus the town, under Polish administration. Subsequently, Brzeg and Lower Silesia were repopulated by Poles whom Soviets expelled from the eastern part of Interwar Poland.

Traditional Garrison Town 

From the late 19th century the then German town of Brieg had expanded into a traditional military garrison town, from 1897 until 1919 it was the home town base to Infantry Regiment No. 157 designated from 1902 the 4th Silesian Infantry Regiment No. 157 (4. Schlesisches Infanterie-Regiment Nr. 157) of the Royal Prussian Army and respectively the Imperial German Army. In 1914 under the regiment's last peacetime commander Lieutenant General Paul Tiede the regiment began mobilizing for the Western Front at the outbreak of World War I as part of VI Army Corps (VI. Armee-Korps), 12th Division (12. Division), 78th Infantry Brigade (78. Infanterie-Brigade).

At the end of World War I the garrison barracks at Brieg remained for some years after without a stationed military regiment. The Imperial German Army Air Arm (Luftstreitkräfte) military aerodrome (Fliegerhorst) found in nearby Grüningen was furthermore dismantled and destroyed as part of the Treaty of Versailles. It was not until 4 August 1930 that the 5th Squadron of Cavalry Regiment No. 8 (5. Schwadron Reiterregiments Nr. 8) of the German Reichswehr arrived in Brieg from Breslau-Carlowitz, other cavalry squadrons from Militsch and Oels followed shortly after. This resulted in the garrison's Tiede-Barracks (named after Generalleutnant Paul Tiede) located in Moltke-, Sedan-, Roon- und Bismarckstraße requiring some alterations to accommodate the new arrival of horse-cavalry residents. It was from Brieg garrison, the German Cavalry Captain (Rittmeister) Konrad Freiherr von Wangenheim became famous for securing a Gold medal win at the 1936 Summer Olympics in Berlin for the German equestrian team whilst suffering from a broken collarbone. In 1933 an airfield located in nearby Hermsdorf was also built and thereby a much larger military aerodrome was established. The new aerodrome was occupied by Flight Reconnaissance Group 113 (Fliegeraufklärungsgruppe 113).

Towards the end of World War II, on 6 February 1945, the Soviet army captured Brzeg, which resulted in moderate destruction of the town's buildings and infrastructure. After Germany's defeat in the war, Brzeg became part of Poland. Since 1950 the reconstructed town has been a part of the Opole Voivodeship.

History of the Jewish population

As the town was situated on the commercial route to Wrotizla, in which a colony of Jews had long resided, Jews settled there about 1324. The Jewish community of Brieg had its separate place of worship from early times. In 1358 Jews lent money to local noblemen and the duke of Brieg, Ludwig I, who granted the Jews freedom of movement in the duchy in that year. In the 14th century the Jews of Brieg were persecuted on account of their usurious practices; one outbreak of such violence occurred in 1362. In 1392 it was claimed that all debts of the duke had been discharged by the payments to a Jew of Brieg (Jacob, the son of Moses), of a certificate of indebtedness. In 1398 the Brieg Jews bought a letter of protection from the duke, whereby they were guaranteed the peaceful possession of their privileges. But in 1401 they were driven from the city, except Jacob and Seman von Reichenbach, who had received a patent of protection from the duke's council for six years from May 1, 1399. In 1423, duke Ludwig II granted the Jews rights of residence on payment of an annual tax of 20 gulden, but they were expelled from the duchies of Brieg and Liegnitz in 1453 as a result of the inflammatory preachings of the Franciscan John Capistrano. Solomo, a capitalist, lent large sums of money to royal houses in the 15th century. In the 16th century, one of the local Jews served as a physician to the duke of Brieg.

With the decline of Breslau as a trade center, the Jews of Brieg became little more than an isolated community; and in modern times they shared the lot of the other Silesian Jews. They carried on insignificant trade operations as a rule. The conquest of Silesia by Frederick the Great brought but slight change in their condition.

A synagogue was built in Brieg in 1799, and a rabbi was first appointed in 1816. The Jewish population numbered 156 in 1785; 376 in 1843; 282 in 1913; 255 in 1933; and 123 in 1939. In the Kristallnacht pogroms of 1938 the interior of the synagogue was completely demolished and the Torah scrolls publicly burned; numerous shops were ransacked. The community was not reestablished after the Holocaust.

Geography

Status

Topography

Brzeg, as the regional capital of Brzeg County (Powiat Brzeski), is located in the west of the Opole Voivodeship, in the south-east of Poland. The settlement is located in the valley of the Oder, located between Opole 38.5 km to its east and Wrocław,  to its north-west. The town has a predominantly flat relief (in comparison to the river scarp on the eastern bank of the river). The River Oder, at low water levels (predominantly between June and early September) forms eyots north of Jerzynowa, Kępa and Srebrna Islands.  The locality is located in the Brzeg Plain (Rownina Brzeska), part of the Silesian Lowlands. The Brzeg Plain's boundaries are outlined by the Oder river to its north, the Nysa Kłodzka Valley to its south-east, the hillocks of Grodków Hills and the Wawrzyszów Hills to its south. The western boundary of the Brzeg Plain is marked by the Oława Valley, along the Oder's mid-course.

The Brzeg Plain was formed by the Riss glaciation period (347,000 to 128,000 years ago), leaving behind remnants of a ground moraine from the last glacial period. The ground moraines have left two equally small hills, bearing characteristics of kames. The kames form the Łosiów Range (Wał Łosiowski), between the confluence of the River Nysa Kłodzka and the Oława Valley. Small streams, having their sources around the range, are fed directly into the Oder in the region of Nysa Kłodzka and Oława.<ref name="Po Ziemi Brzeskiej -

Climate

Settlement and trade
The settlement of Brzeg, historically located in the regional unit of Lower Silesia as opposed to Upper Silesia, is due to the formation of a "przesieka" ("clearing"). The "clearing" was a lateral formation, extending northerly from the former Sudetes Wildland to the southern foothills of the Sudetes Mountains. The clearing's characteristics set it as a point for defence in the Lower Silesia region, lined with barrages made out of cut down woodland. The Brzeg Plain was settled due to its fertile soil, allowing for the earliest forms of agriculture to develop in the locality. The locality was first settled by Silesian tribes and in later history, until 1675, by the Piast duchies of Duchy of Brzeg, Legnica and Wołów, united under the Duchy of Legnica-Wołów-Brzeg. Presently, the region is spotted with numerous towns, including Brzeg, Grodków and Strzelin, as well as villages, with agriculture providing the major source of income. The development of agriculture is met with a lack of forested areas, apart from the Stobrawa Landscape Park, located 7.2 km to the north of Brzeg and the Oder river. The Stobrawa woodland, agriculture and the Oder (as a form of transport) provided Brzeg the necessary diversity to remain the regional trade capital in Silesia.

Brzeg's geographical position between two trade routes, running from west to east (Legnica–Opole) and north to south (Gniezno–Nysa) and further on into the Kingdom of Bohemia, additionally stimulated the town's demographic and economic expansion. Presently, Brzeg remains located between the European route E67 and E40.

Environment

Brzeg has five public parks, three of which encircle the Old Town (Stare Miasto), after the area was transformed into parkland with the deconstruction of the garrison town's fortifications during the Napoleonic Wars in 1807. The parkland, surrounding the Old Town to its south, became known as the Planty. The Planty constitute of the Central Park of J. Czajkowski (Park Centralny im. J. Czajkowskiego), with a total area of 6.1 ha. The Central Park contains an artificial lake and a stream, connecting its waters to the western portion of the Planty, the Park nad Fosą. The Park by the Moat (Park nad Fosą), with a total area of 3.7 ha, is located south of the Silesian Piasts' Castle. The third and largest by area parkland surrounding the Old Town is located by the Oder river, the Odranian Park (Park Nadodrzański), with a total area of 10.9 ha. The castle, together with the town's fortification remnants, the Odrzańska Gate is located in the park.

The largest parkland in Brzeg, located in the south-west of the town is the Park of Juliusz Peppel (Park im. Juliusza Peppela) and formerly Liberty Park (Park Wolności) having a total area of 68.8 ha. The parkland was established after donations from the owners of Skarbimierz and the landed-elite family von Lobbecke donated the area to the town's authorities, to make way for a landscape park in the area. The smallest of the five public parks in Brzeg is the Park Ptasi, located in the south of the town, west of the osiedle of Westerplatte. The park has a total area of 1 ha.

Demography

History
After 1945, the town of Brzeg was part of the population transfers of the Soviet and Polish People's Republic's campaign to resettle Poles from Kresy (annexed by the USSR) to the newly annexed territories by Poland from the defeated Germany, as part of the Potsdam Agreement. During the Polish resettlement campaign, the German population of Brzeg was expelled to the remaining territories of Germany. The newly arrived population in Brzeg predominantly came from the countryside, being former peasants. The integration of the residents came in phases: education, communal work, marriages and the provision of material goods and items left behind by the former populace. By 1975, 37.9% of the population of Brzeg had settled in the town after 1960.

Breakdown of population origin of Brzeg in 1950:

Breakdown of migrant population origin of Brzeg in 1950:

Population change:

Main sights

 The Renaissance Brzeg Town Hall (Rynek), surrounded by thirteenth-century townhouses.
 Old Castle (Zamek), with an interesting adorned façade, host of the Muzeum Piastów Śląskich. The Brzeg Castle is referred to as the Silesian Wawel. The castle-complex includes the Chapel of St. Jadwiga of Poland. 
 St. Nicholas's Church (Gothic architectural style).
 Holy Cross Church (on old castle square), (Baroque architectural style).
 St. Jadwiga's Church, located by the castle.
 St. Luke's Church, a church built in the Neoclassical architectural style.
 Saints Peter and Paul Church, a Franciscan church built in the thirteen-century.
 Christ's Resurrection Church, a garrison church built in the Baroque architectural style.
 Baroque figures of John of Nepomuk and Jude the Apostle from 1722, standing by the façade of the Holy Cross Church.
 Statue of the Holy Trinity (on old castle square), raised in 1731.
 Piast Gimnasium (Gimnazium Piastowskie) founded in 1569.
 Odrzańska Gate, part of the former fortifications; located in the Park Odrzański (Odranian Park).
 Water tower (Wieża ciśnień) by Rybacka Street (ul. Rybacka), from 1877.
 Residential townhouses:
 Rynek 19, Renaissance façade from 1621 (reconstruction).
 Chopina 1, Renaissance from 1597.
 Jabłkowa 5, Baroque townhouse from 1715.
 Jabłkowa 7, Empire architectural style from 1797.
 Old Garrison buildings (Stare Koszary) from the Frederick the Great colonisation period.
 Planty - remaining bastion fortifications around the medieval town. The fortifications were deconstructed in 1807, with the area transformed into the Planty Park. 
 Synagogue from 1799.
 River Boat Station (Brzeg Marina) (on the east bank of the Oder), built in 2012.

Economy

Industry
Brzeg is the centre for industry and production in the Brzeg County. The town's industries include the production of agricultural machinery, electric engines, margarine and sugar production.

The largest concentration of industry in Brzeg is located in the town's eastern quarter, south of the Oder, with numerous manufacturers, including: the German Bartling GmbH (plastic packaging company); "BESEL" (Polish electric engine company, founded in the town in 1950), and CIK car accessories plant. All three industries are located between Ciepłownicza Street (ul. Ciepłownicza) and Składowa Street (ul. Składowa).

Brzeg is also home to one of the largest confectionary companies in Poland, PWC Odra S.A. (founded in 1946). Presently, the firm is part of the joint-stock company Otmuchów Group. The production plant is located by Starobrzeska Street (ul. Starobrzeska).

Tourism
, Brzeg had the lowest number of foreign tourists in the Opole Voivodeship, with some 95% being national tourists. Per 1000 of the population, there are 1.60–3.89 available accommodations, which is behind nine of the eleven regional capitals (being at level with Kędzierzyn-Koźle) in the Opole Voivodeship, including Opole, with 3.90–5.89 tourist accommodations per 1000 of the population.

Education

Brzeg has a total of 7,826 citizens in the potential education age group (3-24 year of age). The number of city dwellers in Brzeg that have completed higher education is at 14.4% of the population, which is similar to the statistical average of the number of people obtaining higher education in the Opole Voivodeship, being at 15.1%. Data from 2015 indicates that 2.5% of the population of Brzeg have completed post-lyceum (policealne) education, with Brzeg having two post-lyceum schools (szkoły policealne): Medyczne Studium Zawodowe by Ofiar Katynia Street (medical practice institution); Policealne Studium Zawodowe – Zespół Szkół Ekonomicznych by Jan Paweł II Street (higher school of economics). The population of Brzeg that is in the age of potential further education (aged 19–24) is 26.8%, out of which 27.1% are women and 26.6% are men.

Some 22.4% of the population of the town of Brzeg has some sort of work-related further education (i.e. scholarship or college course). In 2015, 5.3% of the town's population participated in secondary education, while some 19.6% have attended primary education in that same year. The city council of Brzeg spends 33.3% of its annual budget on education, amounting to 35.2 million zlotys annually.

Post-secondary education institutions:

Public gymnasium (secondary school) institutions:

Transport

Brzeg is located at the crossroads of the National Road  (northbound to Namysłów and Kępno; southbound to Wiązów and Strzelin) and the National Road  (westbound to Oława, Wrocław, Bolesławiec and Zgorzelec; eastbound to Opole, Strzelce Opolskie, Bytom, Kraków, Tarnów, Jarosław and Korczowa. The interchange to the  Motorway (Węzeł Przylesie) is located 14 km south of Brzeg.

Brzeg has well developed railway and bus transportation services. The PKP Brzeg railway station is operated by PKP Intercity and Przewozy Regionalne. The town has direct connections to Opole, Wrocław, Kraków, Warszawa, Katowice, Poznań, Szczecin, Zielona Góra, Lublin, Kielce, Przemyśl, Zamość, Nysa, and other cities. The Brzeg bus service is operated by PKS Brzeg, with ten bus lines around the town and Gmina Brzeg. The important routes are to Wrocław, Opole, Grodków, Namysłów, Nysa, Karpacz, Strzelin, Wiązów, and others. On Sunday, there is a special route to Szklarska Poręba.

In 2013, a hospital helipad was opened by Mossora Street (ul. Mossora).

Sports
 KS Cukierki Odra Brzeg – women's basketball team, 8th place in Sharp Torell Basket Liga in 2003/2004 season

Notable people

 C. de Bridia (born 1247), Minorite friar, wrote the  Tartar Relation (de Bridia meaning "of Brzeg") 
 Johann Heermann (1585–1647), German poet and hymnodist
 Georg Gebel the younger (1709–1753), Prussian general 
 Leopold Wilhelm von Dobschütz (1763–1836), Prussian general 
 Wilhelm Schuppe (1836–1913), German positivist philosopher
 Max Friedlaender (1852–1934), German musician and composer
 Oskar Moll (1875-1947), German painter
 Max Obal (1881–1949), German actor, screenwriter and film director
 Alfred Kurella (1895–1975), German SED functionary
 Johannes Brockt (1901–1980), German-Austrian musicologist and conductor
 Franciszek Gajowniczek (1901–1995), Polish Auschwitz survivor
 Otto Thorbeck (1912–1976), German lawyer
 Kurt Masur (1927–2015), German musician and conductor
 Mieczysław Domaradzki (1949–1998), Polish archaeologist and thracologist
 Adrian Tekliński (born 1989), Polish road and track cyclist
 Kamil Bednarek (born 1991), Polish reggae and dancehall musician and composer. 
 Bartosz Białek (born 2001), Polish football player

Twin towns – sister cities

Brzeg is twinned with:
 Beroun, Czech Republic
 Bourg-en-Bresse, France
 Goslar, Germany

Gallery

References

Bibliography of Jewish Encyclopedia
 Brann, Geschichte der Juden in Schlesien;
 Jahrbuch des Deutsch-Israelitischen Gemeindebundes


By : Gotthard Deutsch & A. M. Friedenberg

External links
 Forum Brzeg
 
 Dziennik Brzeski
 Foto Brzeg
 Komornik Brzeg
 Jewish Community in Brzeg on Virtual Shtetl

Cities in Silesia
Cities and towns in Opole Voivodeship
Brzeg County
Holocaust locations in Poland
Province of Upper Silesia